Lewis Leslie "Mack" McAllister, Jr. (born September 25, 1932), is an American politician. He was a Republican member of the Mississippi House of Representatives, representing Lauderdale County, from 1963 to 1968. He was the first Republican in the Mississippi Legislature in 43 years.

Biography 
Lewis Leslie McAllister, Junior, was born on September 25, 1932, in Jackson, Mississippi. He was an accountant. In 1963, he was elected to represent Lauderdale County in the Mississippi House of Representatives in a runoff election to replace resigning House member Natie Caraway. McAllister, a self-described Goldwater Republican, was the first member of the Republican Party to serve in the Mississippi Legislature since George L. Sheldon, who served from 1920 to 1924. He was re-elected to serve the 1964-1968 term.

References 

1932 births
Living people
Republican Party members of the Mississippi House of Representatives
People from Meridian, Mississippi